Emma Weyant (born December 24, 2001) is an American competitive swimmer.  She was the US national champion at the individual medley. She qualified for the 2020 Olympic Games in the 400m individual medley and won the silver medal in this event.

Background
Weyant lived in Sarasota and swam for the Sarasota Sharks while attending Riverview High School.

Career
At the 2018 Junior Pan Pacific Swimming Championships, contested in August in Suva, Fiji, Weyant won the gold medal in the 400 meter individual medley with a time of 4:40.64 and the bronze medal in the 800 meter freestyle with a time of 8:38.88, which was less than 10 seconds behind gold medalist Lani Pallister of Australia.

In the 2020 Olympic Games, she won a silver medal in the  women's 400 individual medley.

In her debut season at the University of Virginia, Weyant finished second in the 500-yard freestyle at the 2022 NCAA Division I Women's Swimming and Diving Championships, with her time of 4:34.99 ranking as her career best. In 2022 Weyant transferred to the University of Florida.

References

External links

Living people
2001 births
American female medley swimmers
Sportspeople from Sarasota, Florida
Swimmers from Florida
Swimmers at the 2020 Summer Olympics
Medalists at the 2020 Summer Olympics
Olympic silver medalists for the United States in swimming
Virginia Cavaliers women's swimmers
Medalists at the FINA World Swimming Championships (25 m)
World Aquatics Championships medalists in swimming
21st-century American women